Idrettslaget Sandviken is a Norwegian sports club from the neighborhood of Sandviken in Bergenhus borough, Bergen. It has sections for basketball, football and handball.

It was mostly known for its women's football team that played in the Toppserien. It won the league in 2021, and the Norwegian Women's Cup in 1995. The team was renamed SK Brann Kvinner ahead of the 2022 season.

The men's football team currently resides in the Norwegian Third Division, the fourth tier of the Norwegian football league system.

References

External links
Official site

Football clubs in Norway
Association football clubs established in 1945
Sport in Bergen
1945 establishments in Norway